Henry Downs may refer to:
Henry Downs (bodybuilder), amateur bodybuilder and Mr. Universe
Henry W. Downs (1844–1911), Union Army soldier and Medal of Honor recipient

See also
Henry Downes (disambiguation)